The Thomasian Welcome Walk (TWW) is an annual event of the University of Santo Tomas in Manila, Philippines. Freshmen walk through the Arch of the Centuries, a monument that served as the original  doorway to the first campus of the university in Intramuros.

Event
The tradition of passing through the Arch of the Centuries as a welcome to the freshmen community began in 2002. It was first called as "The Rites of Passage". The activities in welcoming the new students were made to complement the Baccalaureate Mass and send-off rites to the graduates at end of the school year.

The parade is followed by a mass that is usually concelebrated by the university rector.

It is a popular superstition that undergraduates should not pass through the arch the opposite way before the send-off rites because it could result in an untimely exit from the university.

Parade route
The parade begins from assembly areas of the different college buildings then converges on Intramuros Drive. The students enter the España Boulevard side of the arch then continues to the Rizal Lane (Lover's Lane) toward the UST Main Building. 

In the early years, the parade passed through the Benavides Plaza and ended in front of the Main Building where a mass and welcoming events were held. The venues changed later on to accommodate the increased freshmen population. In years not affected by the weather, programs are held at the UST Grandstand. The route turns left before it reaches the Benavides Plaza and goes straight to the UST Grandstand. During inclement weather, the route turns right before it reaches the Benavides Plaza and ends at the UST Quadricentennial Pavilion.

List of walks

Virtual walk
In 2020, because of the COVID-19 pandemic, the event was replaced by a virtual tour of the campus with Minecraft. The virtual tour had a dedicated Minecraft server that was constructed by over 80 UST students.

The project won the “Project of the Year” award in the first-ever AcadArena Awards.

UAAP Season 79 opening 
In 2016, the university hosted the UAAP Season 79 opening ceremonies in the campus. Student-athletes from all sporting disciplines of all the member schools passed through the arch. The parade moved straight to Rizal Lane, past the statue of Miguel de Benavides, and through to the Plaza Mayor. This was promptly followed by a 10-minute fireworks display from atop the Main Building.

Postponements
In 2009, the Walk was postponed for more than a month because of the cases of Influenza A(H1N1) virus in the campus. In 2012, like the previous years, the Walk was postponed several times because of bad weather. Originally scheduled on June 28, it was held on September 24 at the UST Quadricentennial Pavilion. The Walk, for the first time, was divided into two batches as the venue could not accommodate all freshmen students. The first batch was held in the morning and it was participated by students from the Arts and Letters, Engineering, Commerce and Business Administration, Tourism and Hospitality Management, Science, Music, and Education High School.  The Walk for the second batch took place immediately after.

References

University of Santo Tomas
Events in Metro Manila